Fania Lewando (1888–1941) was a vegetarian chef, restaurateur, nutritionist, and cookbook author from Vilnius. She operated a vegetarian restaurant called  and in 1938 was author of the first known Yiddish language vegetarian cookbook in Europe.

Biography
She was born in 1888 or 1889 in Włocławek, Warsaw Governorate, Russian Empire (today located in Kuyavian-Pomeranian Voivodeship, Poland). Her parents were Haim Efraim Fiszelewicz, a Fishmonger, and Esther-Malakalah (née Stulzaft). Most of her family emigrated to England or the United States at around the turn of the twentieth century. She married an egg merchant named Lazar Lewando. During the Russian Civil War they relocated to Vilnius, and attempted to emigrate to the United States, but were refused a visa.

Lewando came to be well known in Vilnius for her vegetarian restaurant  which was located on Niemiecka street in the Jewish Quarter; it had a number of bohemian and celebrity guests including the artist Marc Chagall and the songwriter Itzik Manger. She also operated a cooking school which was located a few blocks away. She published her Yiddish-language vegetarian cookbook in 1938. It contained a number of Jewish cooking recipes adapted for a vegetarian diet, and was exported to England and the United States. She attempted to market the recipes to the H. J. Heinz Company.

Lewando and her husband died in 1941 during the Nazi invasion of the Soviet Union. 

In 2017 the German artist Gunter Demnig installed Stolperstein for the Lewandos in Vilnius.

Cookbook

 Original Yiddish version: . Vilnius: Druk. Inż. G. Kleckina, 1938.
 English translation: The Vilna Vegetarian Cookbook. Garden-Fresh Recipes Rediscovered and Adapted for Today's Kitchen, translated by Eve Jochnowitz, with a preface by Joan Nathan. Schocken Books, New York City 2015,.
 Polish translation:  Znak, 2020,.

References 

Women chefs
1880s births
1941 deaths
Year of birth uncertain
Year of death missing
People from Włocławek
Cookbook writers
Yiddish-language writers
Vegetarian cookbook writers
Polish women writers
Jewish women writers
Polish Jews who died in the Holocaust